Brannon is both a surname and a given name. Notable people with the name include:

Surname
 Ann Brannon (born 1958), British fencer
 Ash Brannon (born 1969), American animator, writer and director
 Barbara Brannon, major general in the United States Air Force
 Brittany Dawn Brannon (born 1988), American actress, TV host, model and beauty pageant titleholder
 Buster Brannon (1908–1979), American football and basketball player and coach
 Chad Brannon (born 1979), American actor
 Charles E. Brannon (1919–1942), United States Naval Aviator during World War II
 Cheney Brannon (born 1973), American rock drummer
 Doug Brannon (born 1961), American politician from South Carolina
 Earl W. Brannon (1889–1952), American football coach
 Frank Brannon (born 1965), American book and paper artist
 Fred C. Brannon (1901–1953), American film director of the 1940s and 1950s
 Greg Brannon (born 1960), American physician and political activist
 Harry Brannon (1920–1991), American popular singer
 Henry Brannon (1837–1914), Justice of the Supreme Court of Appeals of West Virginia
 John Brannon (born 1961), American hardcore punk vocalist
 John Brannon (American football) (born 1998), American football player
 Kippi Brannon (born 1966), American country music singer
 Matthew Brannon (born 1971), American artist
 Max Brannon (born 1933), American politician from Georgia
 Philip Brannon (1817-1890), British artist, engraver, writer, printer, architect and civil engineer
 Teddy Brannon (1916–1989), American jazz and blues pianist

Given name
 Brannon Braga (born 1965), American television producer, director and screenwriter
 Brannon Condren (born 1983), American football safety